Joseph Victor O'Connor (born 20 September 1963) is an Irish novelist. His 2002 historical novel Star of the Sea was an international number one bestseller. Before success as an author, he was a journalist with the Sunday Tribune newspaper and Esquire magazine. He is a regular contributor to Raidió Teilifís Éireann (RTÉ) and a member of the Irish artists' association Aosdána.

Early life
O'Connor is the eldest of five children and brother of singer Sinéad O'Connor. He is from the Glenageary area of south Dublin. His parents are Sean O'Connor, a structural engineer later turned barrister, and Marie O'Connor.

Educated at Blackrock College, O'Connor graduated from University College Dublin with an M.A. in Anglo-Irish Literature. He did post-graduate work at Oxford University and received a second M.A. from Leeds Metropolitan University's Northern School of Film and Television in screenwriting. In the late 1980s, he worked for the British Nicaragua Solidarity Campaign; his second novel, Desperadoes, drew on his experiences in revolutionary Nicaragua.

Career
O'Connor's novel Cowboys and Indians (1991) was on the shortlist for the Whitbread Prize.

On 10 February 1985 his mother was killed in a car accident. The mother of his character Sweeney in The Salesman (1998) died in the same manner.

In 2002, he wrote the novel Star of the Sea, which The Economist listed as one of the top books of 2003. His 2010 novel, Ghost Light is loosely based on the life of the actress Maire O'Neill, born Mary "Molly" Allgood, and her relationship with the Irish playwright John Millington Synge. It was published by Harvill Secker of London in 2010.

O'Connor was a Research Fellow at the New York Public Library and Visiting Professor of Creative Writing/Writer in Residence at Baruch College, the City University of New York.

In 2014, he was announced as the inaugural Frank McCourt Chair in Creative Writing at the University of Limerick, where he teaches on the MA in Creative Writing.

He was a regular contributor to Drivetime, an evening news and current affairs programme on RTÉ Radio 1.

O'Connor's latest book, Shadowplay, published in 2019, was shortlisted for the 2019 Costa book prize in the Novel category.

Personal life
O'Connor is married to television and film writer Anne-Marie Casey. They have two sons. He and his family have lived in London and Dublin, and occasionally resided in Manhattan during his work in New York City.

Selected publications
 Cowboys and Indians (1991)
 True Believers (Short Stories)
 Even the Olives are Bleeding: The Life and Times of Charles Donnelly (1993)
 Desperadoes (1993)
 The Secret World of the Irish Male (1994)
 The Irish Male at Home and Abroad (1996)
 Sweet Liberty: Travels in Irish America (1996)
 The Salesman (1998)
 Inishowen (2000)
 The Comedian (2000)
 The Last of the Irish Males (2001)
 Star of the Sea (2002)
 Redemption Falls (2007)
 Ghost Light (2010)
 Where Have You Been? (2012)  (Short Stories)
 The Thrill of it All (2014)
 Shadowplay (2019)
 My Father's House (2023)

Stage plays
 Red Roses and Petrol
 The Weeping of Angels
 My Cousin Rachel – stage adaptation of the Daphne du Maurier novel.
 Handel's Crossing

Awards and honors
2011 Walter Scott Prize, shortlist, Ghost Light
2012 Irish PEN Award, for outstanding contribution to Irish Literature.
2019 Irish Book Award – Eason Novel of the Year for Shadowplay

References

External links
 www.doollee.com – The Playwrights' Database
 identitytheory.com interview
 Barnesandnoble.com interview
 Personal Website

1963 births
20th-century Irish people
21st-century Irish people
Living people
Alumni of University College Dublin
Aosdána members
Irish dramatists and playwrights
Irish male dramatists and playwrights
Irish novelists
People from Glenageary
Sunday Tribune people
People educated at Blackrock College
Irish PEN Award for Literature winners
Irish male novelists